The third series of De Férias com o Ex, a Brazilian television programme, began airing on 27 September 2018 on MTV. The series was confirmed on 17 May 2018. The cast members for this series were confirmed on 6 September 2018, and include Super Shore star Igor Freitas, A Casa series 1 contestants Mauricio Miguel and Vinicius Büttel. Andressa Alves also joined the series as an ex having already appeared in third series of Are You the One? Brasil as well as Augusto Nogueira, who appeared in Conexao Models.

Cast
Bold indicates original cast member; all other cast were brought into the series as an ex.

Cast duration

 Key:  = "Cast member" is featured in this episode
 Key:  = "Cast member" arrives on the beach
 Key:  = "Cast member" has an ex arrive on the beach
 Key:  = "Cast member" has two exes arrive on the beach
 Key:  = "Cast member" arrives on the beach and has an ex arrive during the same episode
 Key:  = "Cast member" leaves the beach
 Key:  = "Cast member" arrives on the beach and leaves during the same episode
 Key:  = "Cast member" does not feature in this episode

Future Appearances

After this season, Any Borges, Felipe "Lipe" Ribeiro and Yasmin "Yá" Burihan, appeared in the 5th season, De Férias com o Ex Brasil: Celebs, Any and Lipe in original cast member, and Yá how "ex" from Lipe.

After this season, Igor Freitas appeared in Super Shore.

In 2020, Lipe Ribeiro appeared in A Fazenda 12, he finished in 4th place in the competition.

In 2021, Any Borges appeared in Ilha Record, where she won the competition.

In 2022, Vinicius "Vini" Büttel appeared in A Fazenda 14, he finished in 14th place in the competition.

References

External links
Official website 

De Férias com o Ex seasons
2018 Brazilian television seasons
Ex on the Beach